Zewapeta is an unincorporated community in Scott County, in the U.S. state of Missouri.

Zewapeta most likely is a Native American name of unknown meaning. It is speculated to be a Shawnee-language name.

References

Unincorporated communities in Scott County, Missouri
Unincorporated communities in Missouri